Aborah is a surname. Notable people with the surname include:

Stanley Aborah (born 1969), Ghanaian footballer
Stanley Aborah (born 1987), Ghanaian-Belgian footballer, son of the above

Surnames of Akan origin